Cyprus have competed in ten Commonwealth Games, making their first appearance in 1978, and missing only one Games since, in 1986. Cyprus have won fifty-three Commonwealth medals, many of them coming in shooting and gymnastics.

Medals

References

 
Nations at the Commonwealth Games